Plaza de Armas is a transfer station between the Line 3 and Line 5 of the Santiago Metro. It is located under the Plaza de Armas of Santiago. The Line 5 station was opened on 3 March 2000 as part of the extension of the line from Baquedano to Santa Ana. The Line 3 station was opened on 22 January 2019 as part of the inaugural section of the line, from Los Libertadores to Fernando Castillo Velasco.

Nearby points of interest include the Metropolitan Cathedral of Santiago, Central Post Office Building, Palacio de la Real Audiencia de Santiago, Santo Domingo Church and the Casa Colorada.

References

Santiago Metro stations
Railway stations opened in 2000
Santiago Metro Line 3
Santiago Metro Line 5